Kabouter Wesley (English: Gnome Wesley) is a Flemish/Belgian series of comics and short animated cartoons about a grumpy and violent kabouter (gnome), made by Jonas Geirnaert. Both the drawing style and the content are purposely made naive and amateurish and the situations are surreal and violent. There is also a lot of insulting and toilet humour in the series.

Concept

Wesley is a gnome wearing a red hat and suit. He is typically cranky and short-tempered. He often has surreal adventures which are told in one-page gag-a-day stories, where he encounters various people, other gnomes and anthropomorphic characters who either confuse him and/or annoy him. As a result, he often gets angry and violent. Both the comic strip as well as the animated TV spin-off are drawn in a simple, naïve style.

History

Geirnaert invented Wesley the Gnome while creating his short animation film Flatlife (winner of the jury prize at the Cannes Film Festival) in 2004. As this film required him to be very perfectionistic and thorough, he drew Wesley the Gnome as a side project and intentionally spent no time on good graphics, interesting plotlines or other recurring characters. In 2008 the comics were published in the magazine HUMO. Despite their popularity Geirnaert decided to terminate the series after only 27 episodes. In the autumn of 2009 Wesley the Gnome was granted new life through a series of animated shorts, broadcast once a week in the human interest TV series Man Bijt Hond. Originally all the shorts were based on the comics Geirnaert drew earlier, but as this material ran short he created several more episodes, which were once again pre-published in Humo. When the TV episodes were uploaded on YouTube as well the cartoons gained an even broader audience, especially in The Netherlands. Due to the cult appeal Geirnaert appeared in several Flemish and Dutch media.

Geirnaert provides Wesley's voice in all the cartoons, typically after roughing up his vocal cords in warming-up sessions. Jelle De Beule, who also collaborates with him in their comedy group Neveneffecten, does the other voices. The animation is made by the Volstok Telefunken studios. The background music is Hammond organ music by Klaus Wunderlich. Other numbers used include La Felicidad from the album The Golden Sound of Hammond (aka Hammond Für Millionen), Hasta La Vista, from the album Hammond Pops 10 and the single Tico Tico. Besides of Klaus Wunderlich's music, also Coconut from The Electronic System was used.

The comics and cartoons quickly became popular with audiences, albeit somewhat polarizing with others who didn't enjoy the intentional silliness and vulgarity. In 2010 a radio commercial for Humo, where Geirnaert provided the voice of Wesley caused controversy due to a joke where Wesley threatens some children with sending them to a "special education" school if they don't obey him. Pedagogues and teachers from schools for mentally challenged children felt the joke was offensive and stigmatized them. Wesley was soon used in all kinds of merchandising, including on the streetcars who drive to the Belgian coast.  A video game spin-off was also created, in collaboration with Geirnaert.

In 2010 Geirnaert once again terminated his series because he ran out of ideas. The same year a huge comic book collecting all the Kabouter Wesley cartoons was published by Borgerhoff & Lamberigts. It was later also released in a smaller format. The animated shorts are not available on video, though they have been collected on video as a one-shot gift with one 2010 issue of Humo.

Episodes

References

External links
 Kabouter Wesley on the website of HUMO
 Interview with Jonas Geirnaert on humortv.vara.nl

2008 comics debuts
2010 comics endings
Comics characters introduced in 2008
Film franchises introduced in 2009
2009 Belgian television series debuts
2010 Belgian television series endings
2000s Belgian television series
Belgian adult animated comedy television series
Belgian comic strips
Belgian comics titles
Gag-a-day comics
Black comedy comics
Metafictional comics
Surreal comedy
Male characters in comics
Fictional gnomes
Fictional characters from Flanders
Belgian comics characters
Comics adapted into television series
Comics adapted into animated series
Television series based on Belgian comics
Animated film series